Nikolay Alekseyevich Zabolotsky (May 7, 1903 – October 14, 1958) was a Soviet and Russian poet and translator. He was a Modernist and one of the founders of the Russian avant-garde absurdist group Oberiu.

Life and work

Nikolay Alekseyevich Zabolotsky was born on May 7, 1903 in Kizicheskaya sloboda (now part of the city of Kazan). His early life was spent in the towns of Sernur (now in the Republic of Mari El) and Urzhum (now in the Kirov Oblast). In 1920, Zabolotsky left his family and moved to Moscow, enrolling simultaneously in the departments of medicine and philology at the Moscow State University. A year later, he moved to Petrograd (now Saint Petersburg) and enrolled in the Pedagogical Institute of Leningrad State Pedagogical Institute.

Zabolotsky had already begun to write poetry at this time. His formative period showed the influences of the Futurist works of Vladimir Mayakovsky and Velimir Khlebnikov, the lyrical poems of Alexander Blok and Sergei Yesenin, and the art of Pavel Filonov and Marc Chagall. During this period, Zabolotsky also met his future wife, E.V. Klykova. 

In 1928, Zabolotsky founded the avant-garde group Oberiu with Daniil Kharms and Alexander Vvedensky. The group's acronym stood for "The Association of Real Art" (in Russian, Объединение реального искусства). During this period, Zabolotsky began to be published. His first book of poetry, Columns (Столбцы, 1929), was a series of grotesque vignettes on the life that Vladimir Lenin's New Economic Policy (NEP) had created. It included the poem "The Signs of the Zodiac Fade" (Меркнут знаки зодиака), an absurdist lullaby that, 67 years later, in 1996, provided the words for a Russian pop hit. In 1937, Zabolotsky published his second book of poetry. This collection showed the subject matter of Zabolotsky's work moving from social concerns to elegies and nature poetry. This book is notable for its inclusion of pantheistic themes.

Zabolotsky's poetry also included works focused on religious themes. These are rooted on his early religious training and expressed Orthodoxy of the peasantry before the revolution. While official biographical statements depicted him as a politically and sanitized Soviet poet, officially and unofficially published works showed that he had more spiritual and intellectual depth. By the 1930s, Zabolotsky modified his poetic style towards "socialist realism" in a move to produce acceptable ideological content.

Amidst Joseph Stalin's increased censorship of the arts, Zabolotsky fell victim to the Great Purge. Arrested in 1938, he was tortured, and accused of taking part of a counter-revolutionary plot with other Leningrad (St Petersburg) writers, including Nikolai Tikhonov, Konstantin Fedin, and Samuil Marshak - none of whom were arrested. He was sentenced to five years to Siberia. This sentence was prolonged until the war was over. In 1944 after his appeal he was freed of guard, but still continued the sentence in exile in Karaganda. In Siberia he continued his creative work and was occupied with translation of The Tale of Igor's Campaign. This followed with his release in 1945. 

Upon his return to Moscow in 1946, Zabolotsky was restored as member of Union of Soviet Writers. He also translated several Georgian poets (including Shota Rustaveli's epic poem The Knight in the Panther's Skin, as well as more modern Georgian poets such as Vazha-Pshavela, Grigol Orbeliani, Davit Guramishvili) and traveled frequently to Georgia. Zabolotsky also resumed his work as an original poet. However, the literature of his post-exile years experienced drastic stylistic changes. His poetry began to take a more traditional, conservative form and was often compared to the work of Tyutchev.

The last few years of Zabolotsky's life were beset by illness. He suffered a debilitating heart attack and, from 1956 onward, spent much of his time in the town of Tarusa. A second heart attack claimed his life on October 14, 1958 in Moscow.

References

External links
 Poems in English
 Lib.ru
 О Николае Заболоцком
 Rassvet.websib.ru
 Николай Заболоцкий. Стихи
 , songs on poems by Zabolotsky by Novoseltseva

1903 births
1958 deaths
Writers from Kazan
People from Kazansky Uyezd
Pantheists
Russian male poets
Russian translators
Soviet male poets
Soviet translators
Translators of The Tale of Igor's Campaign
20th-century Russian male writers
20th-century Russian poets
20th-century Russian translators
Herzen University alumni
Gulag detainees
Recipients of the Order of the Red Banner of Labour
Burials at Novodevichy Cemetery